Peter James Belliss  (born 12 November 1951) is a former lawn bowls player for New Zealand.

Background
Belliss was born in Wanganui in 1951, attending (and playing rugby football at) Wanganui Boys' College. He started playing in the 1970s in the Aramaho (Wanganui) club; Joseph Romanos called him The young Turk of lawn bowls. He had been a railways fitter, and in 1982 was the first New Zealand lawn bowler to turn professional.

Bowls career
At the World Bowls Championships, Belliss won the 1984 singles in Aberdeen against local player Willie Wood, the 1988 pairs with Rowan Brassey, and men's triples with Brassey and Andrew Curtain at the 2000 World Outdoor Bowls Championship in Johannesburg.

He has competed at four Commonwealth Games: 1982 (winning bronze), 1994 (winning bronze), 1998, and 2002; missing 1986 as a professional and 1990 as he had played in South Africa five years previously.

He won six medals at the Asia Pacific Bowls Championships including four gold medals and in 1983 and 1989, he won the Hong Kong International Bowls Classic singles title.

He won the 1981, 1986 and 1992 singles titles, the 1992 and 1995 pairs titles, and the 2009, 2014/15 and 2016/17 fours titles at the New Zealand National Bowls Championships when bowling for the Aramoho Bowling Club.

Coaching
He was a coach at the 2006 Commonwealth Games.

Honours
In the 1988 Queen's Birthday Honours, Belliss was appointed a Member of the Order of the British Empire, for services to bowls. In 2013, Belliss was an inaugural inductee into the Bowls New Zealand Hall of Fame.

References

 New Zealand’s top 100 sports history makers by Joseph Romanos, page 214 (2006, Trio Books, Wellington)

External links
 

1951 births
Living people
New Zealand male bowls players
Commonwealth Games bronze medallists for New Zealand
Bowls players at the 1982 Commonwealth Games
Bowls players at the 1994 Commonwealth Games
Bowls players at the 1998 Commonwealth Games
Bowls players at the 2002 Commonwealth Games
New Zealand Members of the Order of the British Empire
Sportspeople from Whanganui
Commonwealth Games medallists in lawn bowls
Bowls World Champions
People educated at Whanganui City College
Medallists at the 1982 Commonwealth Games
Medallists at the 1994 Commonwealth Games